Waaler is a Norwegian surname. Notable people with the surname include:

Carl Waaler Kaas (born 1982), Norwegian orienteering competitor
Christian Waaler (born 1981), Norwegian bandy player
Reidar Waaler (1894–1979), United States Army soldier
Rolf Waaler, Norwegian economist

Norwegian-language surnames